Mamadou Moustapha Mbow (born 8 March 2000) is a Senegalese professional footballer who plays as a centre-back for Belgian club Seraing on loan from the French club Reims.

Club career
Mbow began playing football with the Senegalese football school Birane Ly, before moving to the academy Darou Salam in 2011. He signed a four-year contract with Reims on 16 January 2019. He made his professional debut with Reims in a 1–1 Ligue 1 tie with Marseille on 22 December 2021. On 27 January 2022, he signed a six-month loan deal with Nîmes in the Ligue 2.

On 1 September 2022, Mbow moved on a new loan to Seraing in the Belgian Pro League.

International career
Mbow is a youth international for Senegal, having represented the Senegal U20s at the 2019 Africa U-20 Cup of Nations.

Personal life
His brothers Pape M'Bow and Moussa M'Bow were also professional footballers.

References

External links
 
 

2000 births
People from Dakar Region
Living people
Senegalese footballers
Senegal youth international footballers
Association football defenders
Stade de Reims players
Nîmes Olympique players
R.F.C. Seraing (1922) players
Ligue 1 players
Ligue 2 players
Championnat National 2 players
Belgian Pro League players
Senegalese expatriate footballers
Senegalese expatriate sportspeople in France
Expatriate footballers in France
Senegalese expatriate sportspeople in Belgium
Expatriate footballers in Belgium